The Vickers Valetta is a twin-engine military transport aircraft developed and produced by the British manufacturing company Vickers-Armstrongs Ltd. Developed from the Vickers VC.1 Viking compact civil airliner, it was an all-metal mid-wing monoplane with a tailwheel undercarriage.

Development of the Valetta commenced during immediate postwar years as a consequence of Royal Air Force (RAF) interest in a military transport model of the Viking. Amongst the requirements stipulated for the aircraft was the need for it to rapidly alternate between various different roles, including that of a troop transport, air ambulance, freighter, glider tug and paratroop carrier. To accommodate these various roles, many of the aircraft's furnishings were designed to be rapidly removed and replaced by alternative configurations. Further design changes from the Viking included the adoption of more powerful Bristol Hercules 230 radial engines, a reinforced cabin floor and a strengthened undercarriage.

Having performed its maiden flight on 30 June 1947, the Valetta was quickly introduced to RAF service during the following year. The type promptly became a major element of Transport Command's activities and participated in various British military operations conducted during the 1950s and 1960s, including the Suez Crisis, Aden, and the Malayan Emergency. It was further developed into multiple variants, including a VIP model, and multiple training models. Most extensively, the Valetta was the basis for the Vickers Varsity, a dedicated military trainer aircraft.

Development

Background
The origins of the Valetta are closely associated with the aircraft from which it was derived from, the Vickers VC.1 Viking, a civil-orientated airliner which had in turn been derived from the Second World War-era Vickers Wellington medium bomber. During the latter stages of the Viking's development, it underwent extensive evaluations by the Royal Air Force (RAF). Several officials took an interest in seeing the type procured as a dedicated military transport variant with which to equip RAF Transport Command, using the aircraft as a quick replacement for numerous worn-out transport aircraft that had served in the Second World War.

It was on the basis of this interest that the Air Ministry decided to formalise the requirement, issuing Specification C.9/46 with Vicker's design specifically in mind. The aviation author C. F. Andrews observed that the specification was relatively forward-looking for the era, particularly as it required the aircraft to be rapidly convertible for performing various roles, including as a troop carrier, air ambulance, freighter, glider tug, and for air-dropping both paratroopers and supplies.

Into flight
The first prototype Valetta, which had originally been built as a standard Viking (c/n 158), was completed during the first half of 1947. On 30 June 1947, this prototype performed the type's maiden flight from Brooklands, piloted by Vicker's test pilot Mutt Summers.

Although the Valetta was named after the Maltese capital Valletta, the aircraft's name is spelt with only a single "l". The Viking and Valetta provided the basis of the Varsity. The Varsity, although similar, was slightly larger and had a tricycle undercarriage arrangement and was equipped with a distinctive under-fuselage pannier for accommodating a bomb-aimer and up to 24 practice bombs.

Design
The Vickers Valetta was a twin-engine military transport aircraft. The fundamental differences between the Valetta and its Viking predecessor consisted of the fitting of more powerful engines, the installation of a strengthened cabin floor and the presence of a sizable pair of reinforced double-doors on the side of the fuselage for loading and unloading cargoes. The use of more powerful engines was largely necessitated by the aircraft's roughly 2,000 lb increase in all-up weight over that of the Viking. The engines fitted to the Valetta were a pair of Bristol Hercules 230 radial engines, each capable of providing up to 2,000 hp.

To best accommodate its use as a transport aircraft, Valetta was designed to accommodate various-sized military cargoes, even relatively bulky ones; thus the interior floor was designed to support as much as 1,500 lb being exerted upon any single focused point of contact; this floor was lined with anchoring points from which to secure cargoes to. Furthermore, many of the interior furnishings were designed to be quickly-removable, enabling the aircraft to quickly be converted between roles; these furnishings included multiple styles of seating, a loading winch, vehicle ramps, floor rollers, glider-towing apparatus, additional fuel tanks, and side-wall soundproofing measures. As a troop transport, up to 34 fully-equipped soldiers could be carried by a single Valetta, while up to 20 stretcher-bound personnel, along with two medical attendants, could be transported in the air ambulance layout; the paratroop configuration accommodated as maximum of 20 paratroopers along with nine 350 lb air-droppable supply containers.

Several external provisions for handling various payloads were present, such as the carriable of supply containers upon twin racks installed under the centre fuselage. To enable gliders to be towed, the rear fuselage featured a pyramid-shaped structure that was used for the anchoring point and release mechanism alike. For extended range operations, optional flexible bag-like tanks could be installed. To accommodate higher weight payloads that had been anticipated in the Viking's operations and to better withstand rougher landings, the undercarriage was reinforced considerably.

Operational history
During 1948, the Valetta C.1 entered service with the RAF. Its arrival in quantity led to the rapid replacement of the wartime Douglas Dakotas within RAF Transport Command, including the numerous transport squadrons stationed across the Middle East and Far East. The Valetta was used over active conflict zones, such as to perform numerous parachute drops over Egypt during the 1956 Suez Crisis. The type was frequently in its transport capacity to support a number of other British military operations throughout the 1950s and 1960s, including during the Malayan Emergency, and Aden.

 
While the vast majority of Valettas were of the C.1 standard, there were several specialised variants inducted as well. The Valetta C.2 was a dedicated VIP passenger transport, its performance was largely similar save for its extended range capabilities.

The Valetta T.3 was built to provide a navigational trainer for service with the RAF College at RAF Cranwell and with No.1 and No.2 Air Navigation Schools. They could be visually distinguished from prior variants by the presence of numerous astrodomes across the top of its fuselage. 40 aircraft were delivered from August 1951, with the last being WJ487 in September 1952. A total of 18 Valetta T.3s were subsequently converted to the T.4 standard, which featured an enlarged nose that accommodate a radar unit, enabling the model to be used for the training of personnel in the Airborne Interception (AI) role.

Several individual Valettas were modified under various experimental programmes performed by Vickers. Various alternative undercarriages were trialled, although these reportedly displayed little change in ground handling performance when compared against the standard configuration.

Variants
 Valetta C.1 - transport, 211 built
 Valetta C.2 - VIP transport, 11 built
 Valetta T.3 - aircrew trainer, 40 built.
 Valetta T.4 - converted from T.3 with radar fitted in nose.

Operators

Accidents and incidents
 On 18 February 1951, an RAF Valetta made a forced belly landing near Stockholm-Bromma Airport following the failure of one engine and radio problems. Airframe icing compounded the situation. Of the 22 passengers and crew, one person was killed. The aircraft was totally destroyed.
 On 15 January 1953, Valetta C.1 VX562 collided in mid-air over the Mediterranean Sea with a RAF Lancaster, all 19 on the Valetta and seven Lancaster crew were killed.
 On 11 November 1953, VX490 disappeared while on air test after departing RAF Changi. All 7 on board died. It is thought the plane broke up in a thunderstorm.
 On 6 January 1954, Valetta T.3 WJ474 crashed near Aldbury, Hertfordshire on takeoff in bad weather from RAF Bovingdon. The aircraft was carrying a rugby team, and 17 on board were killed, with one survivor.
 On 21 February 1954, Valetta C.1 WJ494  Inbound from Hong Kong, crashed  from Singapore's Changi RAF base during a single engine approach. It was alleged that the pilot feathered the wrong faulty engine whilst approaching the runway. The aircraft lost height and hit trees, bursting into flames; of the twelve occupants, three lost their lives.
 On 17 April 1957, Valetta C.1 VW832 crashed at Queria, Jordan, five minutes after taking off from King Hussein International Airport, when the left wing separated after encountering turbulence. All 26 people on board were killed.
 On 22 August 1957, RAF Valetta VX491 'Y' crashed in the jungle near Tanjong Malim, Malaya.  Three RAF crewmen were killed, four 55 Coy RASC AD servicemen survived and were rescued  Possible cause - engine failure.

Aircraft on display

 VX573 – Valetta C.2 in storage at the Royal Air Force Museum Cosford in Cosford, Shropshire.
 VX580 – Valetta C.2 on static display at the Norfolk and Suffolk Aviation Museum in Flixton, Suffolk.

A Valetta T.3 cockpit is displayed at the South Yorkshire Aircraft Museum, Doncaster. While there is no certain identification of the cockpit, it is assumed that it belonged to WJ476.

Specifications (Vickers Valetta C.1)

Notable appearances in media
A long sequence in the 1957 film High Flight shows the Valetta T3 used as a flying navigation classroom at RAF College Cranwell.

See also

References

Citations

Bibliography

 Andrews, C.F. Vickers Aircraft Since 1908. London: Putnam, 1969.
 Andrews, C.F. and E.B. Morgan. Vickers Aircraft since 1908. London: Putnam, 1988. .
 Bridgman, Leonard. Jane's All the World's Aircraft 1951–52. London: Sampson Low, Marston & Company, Ltd, 1951.
 Martin, Bernard. The Viking, Valetta and Varsity. Air-Britain (Historians) Ltd. 1975. .
 Thetford, Owen. Aircraft of the Royal Air Force 1918-57. London: Putnam, 1st edition, 1957.

External links

  Newest RAF Transport Flight 1947

Valetta, Vickers
Valetta
Mid-wing aircraft
Aircraft first flown in 1947
Twin piston-engined tractor aircraft